The Party's Over is a 1934 American comedy film directed by Walter Lang.

Cast
 Stuart Erwin as Bruce Blakely
 Ann Sothern as Ruth Walker
 Arline Judge as Phyllis
 Chick Chandler as Martin
 Patsy Kelly as Mabel
 Catherine Doucet as Sarah
 Marjorie Lytell as Betty Decker
 Henry Travers as Theodore
 William Bakewell as Clay

References

External links
 

1934 films
1934 comedy films
American comedy films
American black-and-white films
Films directed by Walter Lang
Columbia Pictures films
1930s English-language films
1930s American films